Amazing Engine was a series of tabletop role-playing game books that was published by TSR, Inc. from 1993 until 1994. It was a generic role-playing game system -
each publication employed the same minimalist generic rules, as described in the Amazing Engine System Guide, but each world book had an entirely different setting or genre. David "Zeb" Cook was credited with the design of the game rules.

History
In 1993 TSR closed down all of its subsidiary roleplaying lines, from Gamma World and Marvel Super Heroes to Basic D&D, and soon replaced these with a new universal game system released via the Amazing Engine System Guide (1993). Amazing Engine was a simple beginner's system, and after the initial rulebook, TSR started publishing setting books, each of which presented a different milieu to play the game in. After 1994, Amazing Engine was cancelled as well. Alternity was intended to be TSR's generic science-fiction system, a replacement for Amazing Engine.

Description
In Amazing Engine, player characters are generated with a set of four core statistics. The core stats were intended to be migrated from book to book, keeping a general character design concept. These stats were then used to build random ability scores, basic characteristics, and skills. The skills have prerequisites which must first be learned. Skill checks are made using percentile dice.

Campaign settings
Below you'll find summary information for the published worldbooks.

Bughunters A near future worldbook where the players are clones forced to fight the aliens. Recycled for d20 Future.

For Faerie, Queen, and Country Magical Victorian England with a twist. Magic and Faeries are real. Includes poster map.

The Galactos Barrier Space opera a la Star Wars (except that instead of "the Force" it is called music).

Kromosome Biopunk using both traditional cyberware and genetic materials from animals.

Magitech D&D meets Earth. Fantasy mixed with the contemporary world. Basically, how the world would be different if magic were real and elves, dwarves, etc. were around.

Metamorphosis Alpha to Omega Post-apocalyptic science fiction with high technology and mutants - based on Metamorphosis Alpha.

Once and Future King King Arthur lives in 4485 AD. Space flight, combat armor.

Tabloid! A spoof comedy world where you are reporters for a sensationalist newspaper like the ones referenced in the film 'Men In Black'. Also like the film, it's all true. The Loch Ness monster is an alien, Elvis is alive and well etc.

References

Role-playing game systems
TSR, Inc. games
Universal role-playing games